Borf was a graffiti campaign seen in and around Washington, D.C. during 2004 and 2005, carried out by John Tsombikos while studying at the Corcoran College of Art and Design. This four letter word was ubiquitous around the Northwest quadrant of Washington, and ranged from simple tagging to complete sentences to two-color stencils to the massive defacement on an overhead exit sign from the Theodore Roosevelt Bridge to Constitution Avenue. Tsombikos was arrested on July 13, 2005 after tips led police to his latest tag.

One of the most visible tags was the "BUSH HATES BORF" message painted above other graffiti on the back wall of the Vision Lighting Building and visible from the Metro Red Line near the Takoma Metro station. This message was later replaced by a message saying "OBAMA HATES BORF" in early 2009.  Then in late 2011, the notorious icon of Washington, DC culture was seen for the last time and finally painted over during the week of November 28.

The graffiti was also reported to have appeared in New York City, San Francisco, Raleigh, North Carolina, Rome, Italy, and elsewhere.

In 2009, director Paris Bustillos created a documentary film about the campaign entitled Borf!.

Rationale

The campaign attracted widespread attention without first explaining its motivations. According to Tsombikos and subsequent Borf communiqués, both the nickname "Borf" and the Borf face belonged to Bobby Fisher, a close friend of Tsombikos' who had committed suicide. In a video shown on July 29, 2006, the Borf Brigade – the group claiming responsibility for the graffiti spree – asserted that capitalism and the culture of aesthetics created alienation and feelings of worthlessness that contributed to the 16-year-old's suicide. The group said that they used other peoples' property to commemorate and pay homage to their deceased friend. The graffiti usually had overtones of anti-authority sentiments and youth liberation.

Court appearance
Approximately four months after his arrest, Tsombikos appeared before the Superior Court of the District of Columbia. His paint-stained coat, which resembled one that he wore in Libby Copeland's July 14 article in The Washington Post (published after his arrest), was declared evidence by the judge and handed over to the prosecution.

On December 12, 2005, Tsombikos agreed to plead guilty to one count of felony destruction of property. He also agreed to perform community service (cleaning up graffiti) and to pay $12,000 in restitution. Judge Leibovitz ordered him to stay out of the District except for court appearances and classes at the Corcoran College of Art and Design.

On February 9, 2006, Tsombikos was sentenced to 30 days in the D.C. jail, with an additional 17 months suspended, as well as the community service and restitution specified in his plea agreement. At his sentencing, the judge said, "You profess to despise rich people. You profess to despise the faceless, nameless forms of government that oppress. That's what you've become. That's what you are. You're a rich kid who comes into Washington and defaces property because you feel like it. It's not fair. It's not right."

Communiqués

At a Dupont Circle event after Borf's arrest, young people distributed spray paint and anarchist pamphlets. The following was distributed as a "communiqué" at the event:

On July 29, 2006, a group of young people calling themselves the "Borf Brigade" held a march in the Shaw neighborhood of Washington, and projected a "video communiqué" on a wall in which a young woman wearing a Zapatista-style face mask read a statement labeling Tsombikos a "minor Borfist" and announced that he had been "purged" from the group. The video also said,

Consolation of Ruin art show

In April 2007, wheat-pasted posters announcing a "BORF SHOW" slated for the weekends of May 18–20 and May 25–27 began appearing around Washington. The location was "The Bobby Fisher Memorial Building" at 1644 North Capitol Street NW.

The show, entitled "Consolation of Ruin" and sponsored by philanthropist Chuck Burgundy, featured two floors of oil paintings, screen prints, etchings, installations, and video, all for sale in an effort to pay for Tsombikos' $12,000 restitution. One installation (a direct reference to Banksy's "elephant in the room" piece) was of a male figure hanging from a belt from the ceiling and painted to match the wallpaper designs on the wall, camouflaging the lifeless figure. A number of the original stencils used in the graffiti campaign were on display.

After the Borf show, the Bobby Fisher Memorial Building served as a youth-oriented space for music and art until its closing in July 2008.

See also

 Banksy
 Sanki King
 Cool "Disco" Dan
 Culture jamming

References

External links

 borfyou.com
 Borf Interview Visual Resistance March 12, 2005
 "We're all Borf in the end," The Washington Post July 24, 2005
 "Borf Artist Dresses the Part for Court Appearance," The Washington Post November 24, 2005
 "Borf Moves Up the East Coast," Washington City Paper February 3, 2006

American graffiti artists
Culture of Washington, D.C.
Living people
Year of birth missing (living people)
Culture jamming
Anti-corporate activism